Detachments are a London-based, Post-punk influenced Art rock/electronic group led by Bastien Marshal (born Manchester). They were discovered and signed by Thisisnotanexit Records in 2008.

Limited edition 12" release Fear No Fear received excellent reviews including Single of the Day in The Times reviewed by Trevor Jackson who liked what he heard so much that he later went on to produce Messages and The Flowers That Fell.

Official debut The Flowers That Fell (released 2009) achieved NME Radio A-List status, Drowned In Sound  Single of The Day and BBC Radio 1 Alternative Single of The Week on Steve Lamacq's In New Music We Trust show, the track also featured at number 3 in NME magazine's 10 Tracks You Have To Hear feature.

Second single Circles was produced by James Ford and accompanied by H.A.L. produced by Andrew Weatherall. The package includes several acclaimed remixes including the Round&Round Mix by Dubstep pioneer Martyn which is featured on the Fabric 50 compilation.

With its Nouveau Minimal Wave and Cold Wave sound Detachments' ensuing eponymous debut album (produced by James Ford) found them an international cult following. The album is steeped with existential undertones and an austere, dystopian outlook. In 2010 The Guardian columnist Paul Lester nominated Detachments for Best New Bands of 2010 where they sat at the top of the list.

Peter Hook of Joy Division and New Order joined Detachments onstage playing bass with the band for Salford Foundation Trust - Tony Wilson Awards leading to the release of the Fade EP on Hacienda Records in 2012.

2014 saw the release of the Endgame EP which received critical acclaim from the likes of Music Week, Spindle and Clash Magazine (Track of the Day).

2018; German label - Young & Cold Records proudly unveils Detachments' Chain of Command EP. The group continues to perform across the continent.

In 2019 Bastien Marshal performs lead vocals on several songs for Peter Hook's Joy Division Orchestrated at iconic venues including London's Royal Albert Hall and Sydney Opera House.

Discography

Albums
 Detachments (Oct 2010) (CD/LP/download album - released in various countries through ThisIsNotAnExit Records)
 Lost Patrols (Sept 2015) (CD/download album of lost tracks)

Singles
 Fear No Fear (ltd edition 12") 2008, produced by Sebastien Marshal
 The Flowers That Fell, 2009, produced by Trevor Jackson
 Circles, 2009, produced by James Ford
 HAL /Sands of Time (featuring Heather Marlett from Salem), 2010, produced by James Ford/Sebastien Marshal
 Holiday Romance, 2011, produced by James Ford
 Fade EP, 2012, produced by Sebastien Marshal
 Endgame/The Promenade, 2014, produced by Eddie Casula/Bastien Marshal
 Chain of Command EP, 2018, produced by Eddie Casula/Bastien Marshal

Compilation appearances
 This is Not An Exit - Manifesto #1 - featuring "Messages" (TINAE) 
 Fabric 50 - featuring "Circles" (Fabric) 
 Ceremony - A New Order Tribute featuring "Perfect Kiss" and "Mr Disco" (24 Hour Service Station)
 Bill Brewster - LateNightTales Presents After Dark: Nightshift featuring "Flowers That Fell" (Night Time Stories Ltd) 2014
 Artificial Selections 2 featuring "St Lights" (Chromatin Records) 2015
 Young & Cold Sampler featuring "Guilty Party" (Young & Cold Records) 2019

References 

 Detachments on Channel M
 Detachments in Guardian Music Blog, Best New Bands of 2010

External links 
 Interview in R*E*P*E*A*T 
 Guardian Band of The Day Nov 2009 

 BBC review of Detachments LP
 Resident Advisor, Review
 Clash, Track of The Day 2014

English indie rock groups